Luke Bambridge and Jonny O'Mara were the defending champions but chose to defend their title with different partners. Bambridge played alongside Ben McLachlan, but lost in the first round to Wesley Koolhof and Fabrice Martin. O'Mara teamed up with Ken Skupski, but lost in the first round to Mate Pavić and Bruno Soares.

Henri Kontinen and Édouard Roger-Vasselin won the title, defeating Pavić and Soares in the final, 6–4, 6–2.

Seeds

Draw

Draw

References

External links
 Main Draw

Stockholm Open - Doubles
Doubles